Valentin Valentinovich Nefyodov (born 23 February 1982) is a former Russian football midfielder.

Club career
He made his Russian Football National League debut for FC Lokomotiv Nizhny Novgorod on 2 May 2001 in a game against FC Khimki. Overall, he played 3 seasons in the FNL for Lokomotiv, FC Arsenal Tula, FC Anzhi Makhachkala and FC Zvezda Irkutsk.

He also played 3 seasons in the Ukrainian Premier League for FC Chornomorets Odesa, Naftovyk and FC Illichivets Mariupol.

External links 
 
Profile at FFU website
Profile on Official Website

1982 births
Living people
Footballers from Moscow
Russian footballers
Russian expatriate footballers
Expatriate footballers in Ukraine
Russian expatriate sportspeople in Ukraine
Ukrainian Premier League players
FC Lokomotiv Nizhny Novgorod players
FC Chornomorets Odesa players
FC Anzhi Makhachkala players
FC Mariupol players
FC Naftovyk-Ukrnafta Okhtyrka players
FC Arsenal Tula players
FC Zvezda Irkutsk players
Association football midfielders
FC Olimp-Dolgoprudny players
FC Mashuk-KMV Pyatigorsk players